Cambridge Circus is the partly pedestrianised intersection where Shaftesbury Avenue crosses Charing Cross Road on the eastern edge of Soho, central London. Side-streets Earlham, West, Romilly and Moor streets also converge at this point. It is halfway between Tottenham Court Road station, Oxford Street (at St Giles Circus) and the centre of Leicester Square, which is southwest of Charing Cross Road via Cranborne Street. 

The Circus is fronted by listed Georgian and Victorian buildings. Of these, the Palace Theatre has the widest façade; three bars and three fast food outlets, unusually, occupy the ground floors of the others.

Side-street approaches
Earlham Street specialises in fashion; Moor Street in cafés, leading to the Prince Edward Theatre. West Street has St Martin's Theatre and leading restaurant: The Ivy (popular with celebrities and successful artists) and until 2019 L'Atelier de Joël Robuchon (London).

Buildings
The Palace Theatre is on the west side of the junction, while The Ivy restaurant and a number of private clubs are accessible from the south of Cambridge Circus. The listed Georgian and Victorian buildings which make up the junction have featured in a number of espionage and spy films and books.

In fiction
In his espionage novels, author John le Carré placed the headquarters of the fictionalised British intelligence service based on MI6 in buildings on Shaftesbury Avenue and Cambridge Circus; it is from this that Le Carré's nickname for the agency, "The Circus", derives. The BBC's Gordon Corera notes that the entrance described by Le Carré most closely resembles that of 90 Charing Cross Road, just north of Cambridge Circus. The actual MI6 has never occupied premises in or near Cambridge Circus.

The Circus hosted Marks & Co, booksellers, who operated from 84 Charing Cross Road, which featured in Helene Hanff's 1970 book 84, Charing Cross Road, which has subsequently been adapted into a stage play, a television play, and a 1987 movie starting Anne Bancroft, Anthony Hopkins, and Judi Dench. Hanff's book, as well as her other work The Duchess of Bloomsbury (1973), detail her several-decades-long correspondence by mail with Frank Doel, a bookseller at Marks & Co.

In the 2008 film Slumdog Millionaire, the protagonist, Jamal, is asked to locate Cambridge Circus in the Indian version of the game show Who Wants to Be a Millionaire?. He answers the 5 million rupee question correctly, based on his experience working in an outsourced call centre.

Film locations
Cambridge Circus has featured in:
The League of Gentlemen (1960)
Tinker Tailor Soldier Spy (1979)
84 Charing Cross Road (1987)
Match Point (2005)

References

External links

Streets in the London Borough of Camden
Streets in the City of Westminster
Road junctions in London